Vandeurzen is a surname. Notable people with the surname include:

Jo Vandeurzen (born 1958), Belgian politician
Jurgen Vandeurzen (born 1974), Belgian footballer

See also
Van Deurzen